The 1996 UCI Road World Championships took place in Lugano, Switzerland, between October 9 and October 13, 1996. The event consisted of a road race and a time trial for men, women and men under 23.

The men's road race had 151 starters, 49 classified finishers, 15 laps of 17 km, totaling 252 km.
Winner's average speed: 39.39 km/hr

Events summary

References 

 
UCI Road World Championships by year
World Championships
Uci Road World Championships, 1996
International cycle races hosted by Switzerland
UCI Road World Championships